Zaib-un-Nisa is a Pakistani television series directed by Sahira Kazmi, based on a script by Azra Babar and first broadcast on PTV in 2000. It focuses on the subject of domestic violence.

Plot 

Zeb un Nisa drama revolves around a woman, Zebi (Zaib un Nisa) who has two sisters and a brother and Zebi is married whose husband Mahmood is worried about unemployment and he also quarrels with his wife. Both are living in a rented flat. A few years ago, a woman named Saba lived in this flat with her unemployed and destitute husband. Saba's husband, Farooq used to take money from his wife but one day she refused. He got angry and killed Saba. A few years later, Zebi and her husband move into the same flat. Saba's soul used to come and meet Zebi but Zebi did not realize that she was talking to the soul of a dead woman. Just like Saba's unhappy married life, Zebi's life in this flat started to go unhappy. One day, her husband Mahmood beats her, causing her to lose her pregnancy. Mahmood later regrets the loss of his child and the separation of his wife.

Cast 

 Nida Kazmi as Zaibi
 Adnan Siddiqui as Mehmood
 Adrash Ayaz as Ali
 Asad Azmi as Imran
 Sabeen Javeri as Sofia
 Agha Jaffar as Father
 Sajida Syed as Mehmooda
 Zeba Akbar as Salma
 Mariam Ahmed as Ayesha
 Mohib Mirza as Amir
 Naseem Siddiqui
 Muneeza Qidwai as Samina
 Qaiser Naqvi as Mrs Khan
 Saife Hassan as Ehsan
 Ubaida Ansari as Rubina
 Safiya Khairi as Sitwat Aapa
 Maryam Shah as Hina
 Sania Saeed as Saba

References 

Pakistan Television Corporation original programming
Pakistani drama television series
Urdu-language television shows